Lower Polissia National Park is a National Park in Khmelnytsky region, Ukraine, created in 2013.  The park is a  section of Polissia region and includes several lakes and wetland areas as well as parts of river valleys Gorin, Vilia, Gnylyi Rih.

Flora and fauna
The Lower Polissia is a haven for birds - there are 186 species of them, including those unique for the area. Mammals are represented by around 33 species, among them 4 species of European Red List (Alburnoides bipunctatus, Crucian carp, white-tailed eagle, black kite) and 101 species of Annex 2 of the Berne Convention, 11 species listed in the Red Book of Ukraine, including: badger, gray crane, river otter.  The Park’s waters feature 18 species of fish, as well as amphibians.

References

External links
 Указ Президента України № 420/2013 "Про створення національного природного парку «Мале Полісся»
 Указ Президента України № 1129/2008 «Про розширення мережі та територій національних природних парків та інших природно-заповідних об'єктів» 
 На території історичної Волині створено новий національний парк 
 «МАЛЕ ПОЛІССЯ» — ЦЕ УНІКАЛЬНА ПРИРОДА

Parks in Ukraine
National parks of Ukraine
Protected areas established in 2013
2013 establishments in Ukraine
Central European mixed forests